You're Welcome America. A Final Night with George W Bush is a comedic Broadway play written by and starring American comedian Will Ferrell as George W. Bush, which ran from February 5 to March 15, 2009. The play is directed by Ferrell's long-time comedy partner, Adam McKay, who previously worked with him on his comedy films Anchorman and Talladega Nights. According to a review at The Improper.com, "Combined with lewd humor and an uncanny cast of characters to help him drive home his alter ego's West Texas mannerisms, Ferrell’s showpiece is a true delight."

The play is based on Ferrell's George Bush impression, which originated from the NBC sketch comedy show Saturday Night Live (SNL). The first appearance of Ferrell's character appeared in the show's 26th season, which took place during the controversial 2000 United States presidential election. The play carries over some qualities of Ferrell's character that replicates the same comedic element as seen on the popular late night show.

The play broke the house record at the Cort Theater, taking in $846,507.05 for the week that ended on February 15, 2009. The show was broadcast live on the HBO cable channel, as well as in Canada, on March 14, 2009, at 9:00PM EST. It was released to DVD on November 3, 2009.

Plot

The play starts off with President Bush (Ferrell) telling the audience that this is his final farewell to the country. He then makes jokes about his life, such as his college years at Yale, his nickname “Gin and Tonic,” being born in Connecticut, his business that went bankrupt, and the Texas legislation which he as Governor signed into law that designated a day as "Jesus Day." Some of Bush's stories are humorous but false, such as having a sexual relationship with Secretary of State Condoleezza Rice and being AWOL from the Air National Guard. Bush's Secret Service agent Jerry dances onstage (sometimes with Bush's pilot) while Ferrell is offstage changing costume. Bush confronts a heckler in the third row, who is actually part of the cast. The play also acknowledges the hard decisions Bush faced during his term, such as deciding to send troops to the Middle East.

Significance

The play, which took place a few months after Bush left office, was meant as a final farewell not only to the former president himself, but also to Ferrell's impression of the former president.

Cast 
 Will Ferrell as George W. Bush
 Patrick Ferrell as Jerry the Secret Service agent
 Pia Glenn as Condoleezza Rice
 Adam Mucci as Pilot
 Michael Delaney as Audience Heckler

Staff
 Louis Colaianni Vocal coach

DVD notes
Husband and wife performers Kevin Kline and Phoebe Cates are visible in the audience. Also visible in the audience are Edward Norton, Adam Levine, Common, and Serena Williams.

Awards and nominations

References

External links

 
 

Films about George W. Bush
2009 plays
Broadway plays
Cultural depictions of George W. Bush
HBO network specials
2000s American television specials
2009 television specials
American plays
Plays based on real people
Plays set in the United States
Works by Will Ferrell